Einat Wilf (born 11 December 1970) is a former Israeli politician who served as a member of the Knesset for Independence and the Labor Party.

Biography
Einat Wilf was born in Jerusalem and raised in a Labor Zionist family. She studied at the Hebrew University High School in Western Jerusalem. She completed her military service as an Intelligence Officer in Unit 8200 with the rank of Lieutenant. She then went to Harvard University, receiving a BA in government and fine arts, before earning an MBA from INSEAD in France, and subsequently a PhD in political science at Wolfson College, University of Cambridge.

Wilf married German journalist and television personality Richard Gutjahr in 2007. She gave birth to their son in 2010.

Wilf describes herself as a Zionist, a feminist and an atheist.

Political and business career
Wilf served as a Foreign Policy Advisor to Vice Prime Minister Shimon Peres, a strategic consultant with McKinsey & Company in New York City and a General Partner with Koor Corporate Venture Capital in Israel. Upon her return to Israel Wilf worked as a Senior Fellow with the Jewish People Policy Planning Institute and a weekly columnist for the daily newspaper Israel HaYom. Wilf also taught social entrepreneurship at Sapir College, as well as a frequent guest on Israeli radio and television talk shows and a member of the President's Conference Steering Committee.

In 2007, she ran for the presidency of the World Jewish Congress. However, she withdrew before the actual vote, and Ronald Lauder was elected president.

A member of the Israeli Labor Party, Wilf was placed 39th on the party's list for the 2003 elections, but failed to win a seat. She won fourteenth place on the party's list for the 2009 Knesset elections. Although Labor won only 13 seats, Wilf entered the Knesset on 10 January 2010 as a replacement for Ophir Pines-Paz, who had retired from politics. However, in January 2011 she was one of five MKs to leave the party to establish the new Independence party under the leadership of Ehud Barak. She lost her Knesset seat in January 2013 when the party chose not to contest the elections.

Published works
My Israel, Our Generation, BookSurge Publishing (2007), 
Back to Basics: The Road to Saving Israel's Education (at no extra cost), Yedioth Ahronot (April 2008)
Global actors and global politics : the case of the World Jewish Congress campaign against the Swiss Banks (thesis, Cambridge 2008) Cambridge, UK.
Symposium on Rabin's legacy, Fathom, Autumn 2015
Winning the War of Words: Essays on Zionism and Israel, CreateSpace Independent Publishing Platform (November 3, 2015), 
Perry Anderson's House of Zion: A Symposium, Fathom, Spring 2016
Telling Our Story: Essays on Zionism, the Middle East, and the Path to Peace, CreateSpace Independent Publishing Platform (March 19, 2018), 
 The War of Return, Kinneret Zmora-Bitan Dvir (2018),

References

External links
Official website
The Best Explanation of Zionism and Israel
 

1970 births
Living people
Alumni of Wolfson College, Cambridge
Harvard College alumni
Independence (Israeli political party) politicians
INSEAD alumni
Israeli atheists
Israeli columnists
Israeli educators
Israeli Labor Party politicians
Israeli political writers
Women members of the Knesset
Israeli women writers
Jewish atheists
Jewish educators
Jewish non-fiction writers
Jewish women writers
McKinsey & Company people
Members of the 18th Knesset (2009–2013)
People from Jerusalem
People of the Military Intelligence Directorate (Israel)
Academic staff of Sapir Academic College
Israeli female military personnel
Zionists
Writers on Zionism
21st-century Israeli women politicians
Israeli women columnists
Jewish women politicians